Pacarina may refer to:

Paqarina, a concept in Incan mythology
Pacarina (cicada), a genus of insects in the family Cicadidae